Lynn Hopkins (birth unknown) is a Welsh former professional rugby league footballer who played in the 1970s and 1980s.

Playing career

International honours
Lynn Hopkins won a cap for Wales while at Workington Town in the 7-37 defeat by Australia at Ninian Park, Cardiff on Sunday 24 October 1982.

County honours
Lynn Hopkins represented Cumbria.

Career Records
Lynn Hopkins holds Workington Town's record for the most goals in a season (186 in 1981/82), and the most points in a season (438 in 1981/82). He is one of less than twenty-five Welshmen to have scored more than 1000-points in their rugby league career.

References

External links
(archived by web.archive.org) Workington Town » Legends Evening 80's

Living people
Cumbria rugby league team players
Kent Invicta players
Place of birth missing (living people)
Rugby league fullbacks
Rugby league players from Neath Port Talbot
Wales national rugby league team players
Welsh rugby league players
Workington Town players
Year of birth missing (living people)